Stolpersteine is the German name for stumbling blocks collocated all over Europe by German artist Gunter Demnig. They memorialize the fate of the victims of Nazi Germany being murdered, deported, exiled or driven to suicide. The Stolpersteine in Neratovice, a town in the Central Bohemian Region of the present-day Czech Republic (formerly Czechoslovakia), were collocated in 2010.

The Czech Stolperstein project was initiated in 2008 by the Česká unie židovské mládeže (Czech Union of Jewish Youth) and was realized with the patronage of the Mayor of Prague. Generally, the stumbling blocks are posed in front of the building where the victims had their last self chosen residence. The name of the Stolpersteine in Czech is: Kameny zmizelých, stones of the disappeared.

Neratovice

Dates of collocations 
The Stolpersteine in Neratovice were all collocated in 2010:
 13 June 2010: Nádražní 80 (Bedřich Klemperer)

See also 
 List of cities by country that have stolpersteine
 Stolpersteine in the Czech Republic

External links

 stolpersteine.eu, Demnig's website
 holocaust.cz Czech databank of Holocaust victims
 Yad Vashem, Central Database of Shoah Victims' Names

References

Neratovice
Monuments and memorials